Ramon Jimenez may refer to:

Ramon Jimenez Jr. (1955–2020), Filipino executive, Secretary of Tourism
Ramon T. Jimenez (1924–2013), Filipino attorney

See also